The 2010 Judo Grand Slam Rio de Janeiro was held in Rio de Janeiro, Brazil, from 22 to 23 May 2010.

Medal summary

Men's events

Women's events

Source Results

Medal table

References

External links
 

2010 IJF World Tour
2010 Judo Grand Slam
Judo
Judo competitions in Brazil
Judo
Judo